Canglang District is a former district of Suzhou in Jiangsu Province.

The postal code for Canglang District is 215006 and the telephone code is 0512.

On 1 September 2012, Canglang District was merged with Pingjiang District and Jinchang District to form Gusu District.

County-level divisions of Jiangsu
Administrative divisions of Suzhou
1955 establishments in China